From Nowhere is a 2016 American drama film directed by Matthew Newton and written by Matthew Newton and Kate Ballen. The film stars Julianne Nicholson, Denis O'Hare, J. Mallory McCree, Octavia Chavez-Richmond, Chinasa Ogbuagu, Raquel Castro and Tashiana Washington. The film was released on February 17, 2017, by FilmRise. Three undocumented teenagers—a Dominican girl, an African boy and a Peruvian girl—are about to graduate high school in the Bronx, while working with a teacher and a lawyer to try to get proper documents to stay in the U.S. Forced to grow up quickly and navigate problems most adults don't even have to face, the students are really just American teenagers who want to be with their friends, fall in love, and push back against authority.

Cast  
Julianne Nicholson as Jackie
Denis O'Hare as Isaac
J. Mallory McCree as Moussa
Octavia Chavez-Richmond as Sophie	
Chinasa Ogbuagu as Maryam
Raquel Castro as Alyssa
Tashiana Washington as Amina
Sydni Beaudoin as Sara
Jim Norton as Louis
Portia Johnson	
Helen Beyene 		
Erica Camarano as Carlita
Joseph Castillo-Midyett as Javier 
Emilio Cuesta as Mike
Shenell Edmonds
Donté Grey as Bobby
Olli Haaskivi as Mr. McGrath
Eliud Kauffman as Emilio	
Anita Petry as Lola
Luke Rosen as Fitzgerald
A.J. Shively as Chris

Release
The film premiered at South by Southwest on March 12, 2016. The film was released on February 17, 2017, by FilmRise.

References

External links
 

2016 films
2016 drama films
American drama films
Films directed by Matthew Newton
2010s English-language films
2010s American films